Aechmea flavorosea is a species of flowering plant in the genus Aechmea. This species is endemic to the State of Rio de Janeiro in Brazil.

Cultivars
 Aechmea 'Fireflies'
 Aechmea 'Gold Sister'
 Aechmea 'Silver Sister'
 Aechmea 'Sister Smoothie O'
 Aechmea 'Sister Smoothie P'

References

flavorosea
Flora of Brazil
Plants described in 1979